Noach, Noiach, Nauach, Nauah, or Noah (Hebrew for the name "Noah", the third word, and first distinctive word, of the parashah) is the second weekly Torah portion (parashah) in the annual Jewish cycle of Torah reading.
It constitutes . The parashah tells the stories of the Flood and Noah's Ark, of Noah's subsequent drunkenness and cursing of Canaan, and of the Tower of Babel.

The parashah has the most verses of any weekly Torah portion in the Book of Genesis (but not the most letters or words). It is made up of 6,907 Hebrew letters, 1,861 Hebrew words, 153 verses, and 230 lines in a Torah Scroll (Sefer Torah). In the Book of Genesis, Parashat Miketz has the most letters, Parashat Vayeira has the most words, and Parashat Vayishlach has an equal number of verses as Parashat Noach.

Jews read it on the second Sabbath after Simchat Torah, generally in October or early November.

Readings 
In the Masoretic Text of the Tanakh (Hebrew Bible), Parashat Noach has five "open portion" (petuchah) divisions (roughly equivalent to paragraphs, often abbreviated with the Hebrew letter  (peh)). Parashat Noach has several further subdivisions, called "closed portion" (setumah) divisions (abbreviated with the Hebrew letter  (samekh)) within the open portion (petuchah) divisions. The first open portion is from the first reading through the fifth readings. The second and third open portion divisions divide the sixth reading. And the fourth and fifth open portion divisions divide the seventh reading. Closed portion divisions divide the first reading, set off the third and fourth readings, and further divide the sixth and seventh readings.

First reading — Genesis 6:9–22 
In the first reading, the Torah writes that Noah was a righteous man, blameless in his age, who walked with God (in one of many of His original translated names). Noah had three sons: Shem, Ham, and Japheth.
God saw that all flesh on earth had become corrupt and lawless. The first closed portion (setumah) ends here.

In the continuation of the reading, God told Noah that God had decided to bring a flood to destroy all flesh. God directed Noah to make an ark of gopher wood and cover it with pitch inside and outside. The Ark was to be 300 cubits long, 50 cubits wide, and 30 cubits high. It was to have an opening for daylight near the top, an entrance on its side, and three decks. God told Noah that God would establish a covenant with Noah, and that he, his sons, his wife, his sons' wives, and two of each kind of beast — male and female — would survive in the Ark. Noah did everything that God commanded him to do. The first reading ends here with the end of chapter .

Second reading — Genesis 7:1–16 
In the second reading, in chapter , seven days before the Flood, God told Noah to go into the Ark with his household, and to take seven pairs of every clean animal and every bird, and two pairs of every other animal, to keep their species alive. When Noah was 600 years old, the Flood came, and that same day, Noah, his family and the beasts went into the Ark, and God shut him in. The second reading ends here.

Third reading — Genesis 7:17–8:14 
In the third reading, the rains fell 40 days and 40 nights, the waters swelled 15 cubits above the highest mountains, and all flesh with the merest breath of life died, except for Noah and those with him on the Ark. When the waters had swelled 150 days, God remembered Noah and the beasts, and God caused a wind to blow and the waters to recede steadily from the earth, and the Ark came to rest on the mountains of Ararat. At the end of 40 days, Noah opened the window and sent out a raven, and it went to and fro. Then he sent out a dove to see if the waters had decreased from the ground, but the dove could not find a resting place, and returned to the Ark. He waited another seven days, and again sent out the dove, and the dove came back toward evening with an olive leaf. He waited another seven days and sent out the dove, and it did not return. When Noah removed the covering of the Ark, he saw that the ground had dried. The third reading and a closed portion end here.

Fourth reading — Genesis 8:15–9:7 
In the fourth reading, God told Noah to come out of the Ark with his family and to free the animals. Then Noah built an altar to God and offered burnt offerings of every clean animal and of every clean bird. God smelled the pleasing odor and vowed never again to doom the earth because of man, as man's imaginings are evil from his youth, but God would preserve the seasons so long as the earth endured. God blessed Noah and his sons to be fertile and increase, and put the fear of them into all the beasts, which God gave into their hands to eat. God prohibited eating flesh with its life-blood in it. God would require a reckoning of every man's and beast's life-blood, and whoever shed the blood of man would have his blood shed by man, for in God's image did God make man. God told them to be fertile and increase. The fourth reading and a closed portion end here.

Fifth reading — Genesis 9:8–17 
In the fifth reading, God made a covenant with Noah, his sons, and every living thing that never again would a flood destroy the earth. God set the rainbow in the clouds as the sign of God's covenant with earth, so that when the bow appeared in the clouds, God would remember God's covenant and the waters would never again flood to destroy all flesh. The fifth reading and the first open portion end here.

Sixth reading — Genesis 9:18–10:32 
In the sixth reading, Noah became the first to plant a vineyard, and he drank himself drunk, and was uncovered within his tent. Ham, the father of Canaan, saw his father's nakedness and told his two brothers. Shem and Japheth placed a cloth against both their backs and, walking backward, covered their father, without seeing their father's nakedness. When Noah woke up and learned what Ham had done to him, he cursed Ham's son Canaan to become the lowest of slaves to Japheth and Shem, prayed that God enlarge Japheth, and blessed the God of Shem. Noah lived to the age of 950 and then died. The second open portion (petuchah) ends here.

As the reading continues, chapter  sets forth the descendants of Shem, Ham, and Japheth, from whom the nations branched out over the earth after the Flood, a section known as the table of nations. Among Japheth's descendants were the Japhetites, which are the maritime nations. Ham's son Cush had a son named Nimrod, who became the first man of might on earth, a mighty hunter, king in Babylon and the land of Shinar. From there Asshur went and built Nineveh. Ham's son Mizraim had sons from whom came the Philistines and Caphtorim. A closed portion (setumah) ends here.

In the continuation of the reading, Canaan's descendants — Sidon, Heth, the Jebusites, the Amorites, the Girgashites, the Hivites, the Arkites, the Sinites, the Arvadites, the Zemarites, and the Hamathites — spread out from Sidon as far as Gerar, near Gaza, and as far as Sodom and Gomorrah. Another closed portion (setumah) ends here.

The continuation of the reading set forth Shem's descendants, among whom was Eber. The sixth reading and the third open portion end here with the end of chapter .

Seventh reading — Genesis 11:1–32 
In the seventh reading, in chapter , everyone on earth spoke the same language. As people migrated from the east, they settled in the land of Shinar. People there sought to make bricks and build a city and a tower with its top in the sky, to make a name for themselves, so that they not be scattered over the world. God came down to look at the city and tower, and remarked that as one people with one language, nothing that they sought would be out of their reach. God went down and confounded their speech, so that they could not understand each another, and scattered them over the face of the earth, and they stopped building the city. Thus the city was called Babel. The fourth open portion (petuchah) ends here.

The continuation of the reading sets forth the descendants of Shem. Eight closed portion (setumah) divisions separate each generation.

As the reading continues, eight generations after Shem, Terah had three sons: Abram (who would become Abraham), Nahor, and Haran.
Haran had a son Lot and two daughters Milcah and Iscah, and then died in Ur during the lifetime of his father Terah.

In the maftir reading that concludes the parashah, Abram married Sarai, and Nahor married Haran's daughter Milcah. Sarai was barren. Terah took Abram, Sarai, and Lot and set out together from Ur for the land of Canaan, but when they had come as far as Haran, they settled there, and there Terah died. The seventh reading, the fifth open portion, chapter , and the parashah end here.

Readings according to the triennial cycle 
Jews who read the Torah according to the triennial cycle of Torah reading read the parashah according to the following schedule:

In ancient parallels 
The parashah has parallels in these ancient sources:

Genesis chapters 6–8 

Tablet 11 of the Epic of Gilgamesh, composed in Mesopotamia in the 14th to 11th centuries BCE, presents a parallel flood story to that in Parashat Noach. John J. Collins reported that the flood story that came to be part of the Epic of Gilgamesh appears to have previously been an independent tale in Sumerian. Gary Rendsburg notes these similarities and differences:

In inner-biblical interpretation 
The parashah has parallels or is discussed in these Biblical sources:

Genesis chapter 6 

For I have singled him out, that he may instruct his children and his posterity to keep the way of the Lord by doing what is just and right, in order that the Lord may bring about for Abraham what He has promised him."

Genesis chapter 11 
 reports that Abram's father Terah lived beyond the River Euphrates and served other gods.

While  reports that Terah took Abram, Lot, and Sarai from Ur of the Chaldees to Haran, and  subsequently reports God's call to Abram to leave his country and his father's house,  reports that God chose Abram and brought him out of Ur of the Chaldees.

In classical Rabbinic interpretation 
The parashah is discussed in these rabbinic sources from the era of the Mishnah and the Talmud:

Genesis chapter 6 
Resh Lakish, however, maintained that if even in his generations Noah was able to be righteous, then he certainly would have been righteous in other generations. Rabbi Haninah compared Rabbi Johanan's view of Noah to a barrel of wine lying in a vault of acid. In its place, its aroma is fragrant (compared to that of the acid). Elsewhere, its aroma would not be considered fragrant. Rabbi Oshaia compared Resh Lakish's view of Noah to a vial of spikenard oil lying amidst refuse. If it is fragrant where it is, how much more so would it be among spices!

Rabbi Judah taught that only "in his generations" was he a righteous man (by comparison). Had he lived in the generation of Moses or Samuel, he would not have been called righteous. Rabbi Judah said that in the street of the totally blind, the one-eyed man is called clear-sighted, and the infant is called a scholar. Rabbi Judah compared it to a man with a wine vault who opened one barrel and found it vinegar, opened another and found it vinegar, and opened a third to find it turning sour. When people told him that it was turning, he asked if the vault contained any better. Similarly, "in his generations" Noah was a righteous man. Rabbi Nehemiah, however, taught that if Noah was righteous even in his generation (in spite of the corrupt environment), how much more so would he have been, had he lived in the age of Moses. Rabbi Nehemiah compared Noah to a tightly closed vial of perfume in a graveyard, which nevertheless gave forth a fragrant aroma. How much more fragrant would it have been outside the graveyard.

Rabbi Judah compared it to a king who had two sons, one grown up and the other a child. The king asked the child to walk with him. But the king asked the adult to walk before him. Similarly, to Abraham, whose moral strength was great, God said, "Walk before Me." But of Noah, who was feeble,  says, "Noah walked with God." Rabbi Nehemiah compared Noah to a king's friend who was plunging about in dark alleys, and when the king saw him sinking in the mud, the king urged his friend to walk with him instead of plunging about. Abraham's case, however, was compared to that of a king who was sinking in dark alleys, and when his friend saw him, the friend shined a light for him through the window. The king then asked his friend to come and shine a light before the king on his way. Thus, God told Abraham that instead of showing a light for God from Mesopotamia, he should come and show one before God in the Land of Israel.

The Midrash compared this to a king whose son went on a mission for his father. The road ahead of him was sunken in mire, and the king supported him so that he would not sink in the mire. For the Patriarchs would try to anticipate the Divine Presence, and would go ahead to do God's will.

Only to do justly, and to love mercy, and to walk humbly with your God." Moreover, the Midrash taught that Noah took upon himself the yoke of the Seven Commandments and transmitted them to his sons, and thus of him,  says, "He that walks in his integrity as a just man, happy are his children after him."

Rabbi Abba bar Kahana read  together to report God saying, "I repent that I have made them and Noah." Thus even Noah, who was left, was not worthy, save that (in the words of ) "Noah found grace in the eyes of the Lord."

She was called Naamah, because her deeds were pleasing (ne'imim). But the Rabbis said that Naamah was a woman of a different stamp, for her name denotes that she sang (man'emet) to the timbrel in honor of idolatry.

The Mishnah concluded that the generation of the Flood and the generation of the dispersion after the Tower of Babel were both so evil as to have no share in the world to come. Rabbi Akiva deduced from the words of  that the generation of the Flood will have no portion in the world to come; he read the words "and every living substance was destroyed" to refer to this world and the words "that was on the face of the ground" to refer to the next world. Rabbi Judah ben Bathyra deduced from the words "My spirit will not always enter into judgment with man" of  that God will neither revive nor judge the generation of the Flood on Judgment Day.

The Tosefta taught that the generation of the Flood acted arrogantly before God on account of the good that God lavished on them. So (in the words of ) "they said to God: 'Depart from us; for we desire not the knowledge of Your ways. What is the Almighty, that we should serve Him? And what profit should we have, if we pray unto Him?'" They scoffed that they needed God for only a few drops of rain, and they deluded themselves that they had rivers and wells that were more than enough for them, and as  reports, "there rose up a mist from the earth." God noted that they took excess pride based upon the goodness that God lavished on them, so God replied that with that same goodness God would punish them. And thus  reports, "And I, behold, I do bring the flood of waters upon the earth." Similarly, the Rabbis taught in a Baraita that the good that God lavished upon the generation of the Flood led them to become arrogant.

And  shows that "corruption" connotes idolatry when it says, "lest you deal corruptly (tashchitun), and make a graven image."

Rabbi Johanan deduced from the words "all flesh had corrupted their way upon the earth" in  that they mated domesticated animals with wild animals, and animals with humans. Rav Abba bar Kahana taught that after the Flood, they all returned to their own kind, except for the tushlami bird.

Interpreting , Rabbi Johanan deduced that the consequences of robbery are great. For though the generation of the Flood transgressed all laws, God sealed their decree of punishment only because they robbed. In , God told Noah that "the earth is filled with violence (that is, robbery) through them, and, behold, I will destroy them with the earth." And  also states, "Violence (that is, robbery) is risen up into a rod of wickedness; none of them shall remain, nor of their multitude, nor any of theirs; neither shall there be wailing for them." Rabbi Eleazar interpreted  to teach that violence stood up before God like a staff, and told God that there was no good in any of the generation of the Flood, and none would bewail them when they were gone.

Interpreting , Rabbi Haninah told what the people of the age of the Flood used to do. When a person brought out a basket of beans for sale, one would come and seize less than the worth of the smallest coin in circulation, a perutah (and thus there was no redress under the law). And then everyone would come and seize less than a perutah's worth, so that the seller had no redress at law. Seeing this, God said that the people had acted improperly, so God would deal with them improperly (in a way that they would not relish).

Interpreting , Rabbi Levi taught that "violence" (chamas) connotes idolatry, sexual immorality, and murder, as well as robbery.

It was as if a prince had a tutor, and whenever the prince did wrong, the king punished the tutor. Or it was as if a young prince had a nurse, and whenever the prince did wrong, the king punished the nurse. Similarly, God said that God would destroy the generation of the Flood along with the earth that nurtured them.

Rabbi Isaac taught that God told Noah that just as a pair of birds (ken) cleansed a person with skin disease (as instructed in ), so Noah's Ark would cleanse Noah (so that he would be worthy to be saved from the Flood).

Rabbi Yassa noted that in four places, Scripture uses the expression, "make for yourself (oseh l'cha)." In three of those instances, God explained the material from which to make the thing, and in one God did not.  says, "Make for yourself an ark of gopher wood";  says, "make for yourself two silver trumpets"; and  says, "make for yourself knives of flint." But  says merely, "make for yourself a fiery serpent" without further explanation. So Moses reasoned that a serpent is essentially a snake, and made the snake of copper, because in Hebrew, the word for copper (nechoshet) sounds like the word for snake (nechash).

While  tells that Noah's Ark had pitch "within and without",  tells that Jochebed daubed the Ark of the infant Moses "with slime and with pitch". A Tanna taught that the slime was inside and the pitch outside so that that righteous child would not have to smell the bad odor of the pitch.

With the index finger, God showed Moses what the children of Israel should give for the redemption of their souls, as  says, "This they shall give ... half a shekel for an offering to the Lord." With the thumb and all the hand, God will in the future smite God's enemies (who Rabbi Ishmael identified as the children of Esau and Ishmael), as  says, "Let your hand be lifted up above your adversaries, and let all your enemies be cut off."

Similarly, Rav Achava bar Zeira taught that when Noah entered the Ark, he brought precious stones and jewels with him to keep track of day and night. When the jewels shone dimly, he knew that it was daytime, and when they shone brightly, he knew that it was night. The Gemara noted that it was important for Noah to be able to tell day from night, for some animals eat only during the day, and others eat only during the night, and thus Noah could determine the proper feeding times for the animals under his care. The Gemara noted that if in  God told Noah, "A window shall you make to the ark," then Noah should have been able to tell day from night. The Gemara explained that Noah needed the jewels because the account of Noah bringing jewels into the Ark followed the view that the celestial bodies — including the sun — did not serve during the year of the Flood. (Thus, no sunlight entered the Ark, and  must refer to jewels rather than a window.)

A Midrash, however, reported that some said that the words, "with lower, second, and third stories shall you make it," meant that the bottom story was for waste, the second for Noah's family and the clean animals, and the third for the unclean animals. And the Midrash reported that others said that the bottom story was for the unclean animals, the second for Noah's family and the clean animals, and the top for the garbage. The Midrash taught that Noah managed to move the waste by arranging a kind of trapdoor through which he shoveled it sideways.

Noting that  calls Noah "a man," a Midrash taught that wherever Scripture employs the term "a man," it indicates a righteous man who warned his generation. The Midrash taught that for 120 years (deduced from ), Noah planted cedars and cut them down. When they would ask him what he was doing, he would reply that God had informed him that God was bringing a flood. Noah's contemporaries replied that if a flood did come, it would come only on Noah's father's house. Rabbi Abba taught that God said that one herald arose for God in the generation of the Flood — Noah. But they despised him and called him a contemptible old man.

Noah urged them to repent, or God would bring a deluge upon them and cause their bodies to float upon the water like gourds, reading  to say, "He floats lightly upon the face of the waters." Moreover, Noah told them that they would be taken as a curse for all future generations, as  says, "their portion is cursed." And Rabbi Jose of Caesarea taught that the words, "he turns not by the way of the vineyards," indicate that as the people worked in their vineyards, they asked Noah what prevented God from bringing the Flood at that moment. And Noah replied that God had one dear one, one dove, to draw out before God could bring the Flood. (That is, the aged Methuselah had to die first, so that he would not suffer the punishment of the Flood).

Similarly, a Midrash taught that Noah reproved them, calling them good-for-nothings who forsook the One whose voice breaks cedars, to worship a dry log.

They called Noah "old man," and asked him what the Ark was for. Noah replied that God was bringing a flood upon them. They asked with what God would flood the earth. If God brought a flood of fire, they said, they had a thing called alitha (that would extinguish fire). If God brought a flood of water up from the earth, they said, they had iron plates with which they could cover the earth (to prevent the water from coming up). If God brought a flood of water from heaven, they said, they had a thing called akob (or some say akosh) (that could ward it off). Noah replied that God would bring it from between the heels of their feet, as  says, "He is ready for the steps of your feet."

A Midrash compared Noah to Moses and found Moses superior. While Noah was worthy to be delivered from the generation of the Flood, he saved only himself and his family, and had insufficient strength to deliver his generation. Moses, however, saved both himself and his generation when they were condemned to destruction after the sin of the Golden Calf, as  reports, “And the Lord repented of the evil that He said He would do to His people.” The Midrash compared the cases to two ships in danger on the high seas, on board of which were two pilots. One saved himself but not his ship, and the other saved both himself and his ship.

A Baraita interpreted  to teach that the waters of the Flood were as hot and viscous as bodily fluids. And Rav Hisda taught that since it was with hot passion that they sinned, it was with hot water that they were punished. For  says, "And the water cooled" (yashoku, more often translated as 'abated'), and  says, "Then the king's wrath cooled down" (shachachah).

According to the Pirke De-Rabbi Eliezer, Noah warned the generation of the Flood to turn from their evil deeds, so that God would not bring the Flood upon them. But they told Noah that if God brought the Flood, they were so tall that the waters would not reach up to their necks, and their feet could plug up the depths. So they placed their feet to close up all the depths. So God heated the waters of the deep so that they rose and burnt their flesh, and peeled off their skin, as  says, "What time they wax warm, they vanish; when it is hot, they are consumed out of their place."

Further, the Midrash taught, Noah needed a covenant to prevent giants from plugging the openings of the deep and seeking to enter the Ark. And Noah needed a covenant to prevent additional lions from coming into the Ark. Rabbi Hiyya bar Abba explained that God was thus telling Noah that though he may have built the Ark, but for God's covenant, Noah could not have entered the Ark.

Rabbi Hanan said in the name of Rabbi Samuel ben Isaac that as soon as Noah entered the Ark, God prohibited his family from cohabitation, saying in  "you shall come into the Ark, you, and your sons," speaking of them apart, and, "your wife, and your sons' wives," speaking of them apart. When Noah left the Ark, God permitted cohabitation to him again, saying in  "Go forth from the Ark, you and your wife," speaking of them together. Similarly, Rabbi Johanan deduced from the same sources that God had forbidden cohabitation for all the Ark's inhabitants. The Rabbis taught in a Baraita that three nonetheless cohabited in the Ark — the dog, the raven, and Ham — and they were all punished.

Genesis chapter 7 
Reading in  the command that "of every clean beast you shall take seven, man and wife," the Gemara asked whether beasts have marital relationships. Rabbi Samuel bar Nahman said in Rabbi Jonathan's name that the command means of those animals with which no sin had been committed (that is, animals that had not mated with other species). The Gemara asked how Noah would know. Rav Hisda taught that Noah led them past the Ark, and those that the Ark accepted had certainly not been the object of sin, while those that the Ark rejected had certainly been the object of sin. And Rabbi Abbahu taught that Noah took only those animals (fulfilling that condition) that came of their own accord. Similarly, Rav Hisda asked how Noah knew (before the giving of ) which animals were clean and which were unclean. Rav Hisda explained that Noah led them past the Ark, and those that the Ark accepted (in multiples of seven) were certainly clean, and those that the Ark rejected were certainly unclean. Rabbi Abbahu cited , "And they that went in, went in male and female," to show that they went in of their own accord (in their respective pairs, seven of the clean and two of the unclean).

Reading in  the command to take into the Ark "of the fowl also of the air, seven each," a Midrash hypothesized that the command might have meant seven of each kind of animal (three of one gender and four of the other). But then one of them would lack a mate. Hence the Midrash concluded that God meant seven males and seven females. Of course God did not need them, but they were to come (in the words of ) "to keep seed alive upon the face of all the earth."

Similarly, Rabbi Johanan taught that because the generation of the Flood corrupted the features that take shape after 40 days (in the womb), God announced in  that God would "cause it to rain upon the earth 40 days and 40 nights, and every living substance that I have made will I blot out."

Reading in  that God said, "every living substance (yekum) that I have made will I blot out," Rabbi Abin taught that this included the one who rose up (yakam) against his brother — Cain. Rabbi Levi said in the name of Resh Lakish that God kept Cain's judgment in suspense until the Flood and then God swept Cain away. And thus Rabbi Levi read  to say, "And He blotted out every one that had arisen."

A Midrash read the words "And Noah did all that the Lord commanded him," in  narrowly to refer to the taking in of the animals, beasts, and birds.

The Gemara read  to employ the euphemistic expression "not clean," instead of the brief, but disparaging expression "unclean," so as not to speak disparagingly of unclean animals.

Reading in  that "it came to pass, after seven days, that the waters of the Flood were upon the earth," the Gemara asked what the nature of these seven days was (that God delayed the Flood on their account). Rav taught that these were the days of mourning for Methuselah, and thus that lamenting the righteous postpones retribution. Another explanation is that during "the seven days" God reversed the order of nature (bereishit) (established at the beginning of creation), and the sun rose in the west and set in the east (so that sinners might be shocked into repentance). Another explanation is that God first appointed for them a long time (the 120 years to which  alludes), and then a short time (a seven-day grace period in which to repent). Another explanation is that during "the seven days," God gave them a foretaste of the world to come, so that they might know the nature of the rewards of which they were depriving themselves.

Rabbi Jacob bar Acha interpreted Moses to tell Aaron that just as God observed seven days of mourning for the then-upcoming destruction of the world at the time of the Flood of Noah, so too Aaron would observe seven days of mourning for the upcoming death of his sons Nadab and Abihu. The Gemara asked whether one mourns before a death, as Jacob bar Acha appears to argue happened in these two cases. In reply, the Gemara distinguished between the mourning of God and people: People, who do not know what will happen until it happens, do not mourn until the deceased dies. But God, who knows what will happen in the future, mourned for the world before its destruction. The Gemara noted, however, that there are those who say that the seven days before the Flood were days of mourning for Methuselah (who died just before the Flood).

A Midrash taught that God kept seven days of mourning before God brought the Flood, as  reports, "And it came to pass after the seven days, that the waters of the flood were upon the earth." The Midrash deduced that God was mourning by noting that  reports, "And it repented the Lord that He had made man on the earth, and it grieved Him (vayitatzeiv) at His heart." And 2 Samuel  uses the same word to express mourning when it says, "The king grieves (ne'etzav) for his son."

Rabbi Joshua taught that the events of  took place on the seventeenth day of Iyar, when the constellation of the Pleiades sets at daybreak and the fountains begin to dry up. Because the generation of the Flood perverted its ways (from the way of creation), God changed for them the work of creation and made the constellation of the Pleiades rise at daybreak. God took two stars from the Pleiades and brought the Flood on the world. Rabbi Eliezer, however, taught that the events of  took place on the seventeenth of Cheshvan, a day on which the constellation of the Pleiades rises at daybreak, and the season when the fountains begin to fill. Because the generation of the Flood perverted its ways (from the way of creation), God changed for them the work of creation, and caused the constellation of the Pleiades to rise at daybreak. God took away two stars from it and brought the Flood on the world. If one accepts the view of Rabbi Joshua, then one can understand why  speaks of the "second month" (to describe Iyar, because  describes Nisan as the first month, and Iyar follows Nisan). If one accepts Rabbi Eliezer's view, the "second month" means the month that is second to the Day of Judgment (Rosh Hashanah, which  recognizes as the beginning of a year when it says, "The eyes of the Lord are upon it (the Land of Israel) from the beginning of the year"). If one accepts Rabbi Joshua's view, the change in the work of creation was the change in the constellation and the waters. If one accepts Rabbi Eliezer's view, the Gemara asked what change there was in the natural order (as the constellation usually rose at that time and that time of year is usually the rainy season). The Gemara found the answer in the dictum of Rabbi Hisda, when he said that with hot passion they sinned, and with hot waters were they punished. The Rabbis taught in a Baraita that the Sages of Israel follow Rabbi Eliezer in dating the Flood (counting Rosh Hashanah as the beginning of the year) and Rabbi Joshua in dating the annual cycles (holding that God created the world in Nisan). The scholars of other peoples, however, follow Rabbi Joshua in dating the Flood as well.

Rabbi Johanan taught that because the corruption of the generation of the Flood was great, their punishment was also great.  characterizes their corruption as great (rabbah), saying, "And God saw that the wickedness of man was great in the earth." And  characterizes their punishment as great (rabbah), saying, "on the same day were all the fountains of the great deep broken up." Rabbi Johanan reported that three of those great thermal fountains remained open after the Flood — the gulf of Gaddor, the hot-springs of Tiberias, and the great well of Biram.

The Gemara read the word "bird" (tzippor) here to refer only to clean birds, and "winged" (kanaf) to include both unclean birds and grasshoppers.

In a Baraita, Rabbi Eleazar of Modi'im interpreted , "Fifteen cubits upward did the waters prevail; and the mountains were covered." Rabbi Eleazar of Modi'im asked whether waters that measured fifteen cubits high on the mountains could also measure fifteen cubits in the valley. To do so, the waters would have to stand like a series of walls (terraced with the topography). And if so, the ark could not have come to rest on the top of the mountains. Rather, Rabbi Eleazar of Modi'im taught that all the fountains of the great deep came up first until the water was even with the mountains, and then the water rose fifteen more cubits.

Reading in  that "all that was on the dry land died," the Gemara deduced that the fish in the sea did not die (apparently not having committed the transgressions that land animals had).

The Tosefta taught that the Flood killed people before animals (as seen in the order of ), because man sinned first (as shown in ).

Rabbi taught that, in conferring honor, the Bible commences with the greatest, in cursing with the least important. With regard to cursing, the Gemara reasoned that Rabbi must have meant the punishment of the Flood, as  says, "And He blotted out every living substance which was upon the face of the ground, both man and cattle," starting with the people before the cattle.

Reading in  that "every living substance was destroyed that was upon the face of the ground" — people and animals alike — the Gemara asked how the beasts had sinned (to deserve this punishment). A Baraita on the authority of Rabbi Joshua ben Karha compared this to a father who set up a bridal canopy for his son, and prepared a banquet with every sort of food. But then his son died. So the father broke up the canopy, saying that he had prepared it only for his son. Now that the son was dead, the father had no need for a banquet. Thus God created the animals only for the benefit of people. Now that people had sinned, God had no need for the animals.

The Mishnah taught that those who vow not to benefit from the children of Noah may not benefit from non-Jews, but may benefit from Jews. The Gemara asked how Jews could be excluded from the "children of Noah," as  indicates that all humanity descended from Noah. The Gemara answered that since God singled out Abraham, Jews are considered descendants of Abraham.

Genesis chapter 8 
It was evident that God hated the raven because God commanded Noah to save seven pairs of the clean creatures on the Ark, but only two of the unclean (among which the raven counted itself under ). And it was evident that Noah hated the raven because Noah had left in the Ark the species of which there were seven pairs, and sent one of which there were only two. If the angel of heat or cold had smitten the raven, the world would have been missing the raven's kind.

The raven asked Noah why of all the birds that Noah had in the Ark Noah sent none but the raven. Noah retorted that the world had no need of the raven; the raven was fit neither for food nor for sacrifice. Rabbi Berekiah said in Rabbi Abba's name that God told Noah to take that back, because the world would need ravens in the future. Noah asked God when the world would need ravens. God replied that (in the words of ) "when the waters dry off from on the earth," a righteous man (Elijah) would arise and dry up the world (threatening drought, and then see the threat fulfilled). And God would cause him to have need of ravens, as 1 Kings  reports, "And the ravens (orvim) brought him bread and flesh." Rabbi Judah maintained that the word orvim referred to a town within the borders of Bashan called Arbo. But Rabbi Nehemiah insisted that  literally meant ravens, and the ravens brought Elijah food from King Jehoshaphat's table.

(Of the raven,  says, "he sent forth a raven." But of the dove,  says, "he sent forth a dove from him" indicating that the dove was with him.)

Rabbi Abba taught that the dove brought it from the young shoots of the Land of Israel. Rabbi Levi taught that the dove brought it from the Mount of Olives, for the Flood had not submerged the Land of Israel. Thus God told Ezekiel (in ): "Son of man, say to her: 'You are a land that is not cleansed, nor rained upon on the day of indignation.'" Rabbi Birai (or some say Rabbi Berekiah) taught that the gates of the Garden of Eden were opened for the dove, and from there the dove brought the olive leaf. Rabbi Abbahu asked if the dove had brought it from the Garden of Eden, would the dove not have brought something better, like cinnamon or a balsam leaf. But in fact the dove was giving Noah a hint, saying to him in effect that better is bitterness from God than sweetness from Noah's hand.

Shem replied that they had a difficult time in the Ark. During the day they fed the animals that usually fed by day, and during the night they fed those that normally fed by night. But Noah did not know what the chameleon ate. One day Noah was cutting a pomegranate, when a worm dropped out of it, and the chameleon ate it. From then on, Noah mashed up bran for the chameleon, and when the bran became wormy, the chameleon would eat. A fever struck the lion, so it lived off of its reserves rather than eating other animals. Noah discovered the avarshinah bird (some say the phoenix bird) lying in the hold of the Ark and asked it if it needed food. The bird told Noah that it saw that Noah was busy and decided not to give him any more trouble. Noah replied by asking that it be God's will that the bird not perish, as  says, "Then I said: 'I shall die with my nest, and I shall multiply my days as the phoenix.'"

A Midrash recounted that Noah fed and provided for the Ark's inhabitants for all of 12 months. But Rav Huna said in Rabbi Liezer's name that when Noah was leaving the Ark, a lion nonetheless set on him and maimed him, so that he was not fit to offer sacrifices, and his son Shem sacrificed in his stead. The Midrash took this as an application of the words of  "the righteous shall be requited on earth; how much more the wicked and the sinner." From this, the Midrash inferred that if in spite of his comparative righteousness, Noah was punished for his sins, "how much more" was the generation of the Flood.

Rav Huna cited the report in  that Noah offered burnt offerings from every clean animal and bird to support the proposition in a Baraita that all animals were eligible to be offered, as the words "animal" (behemah) and "bird" (of) refer to any animal or bird, and the term "animal" (behemah) includes wild beasts (hayyah).

Rabbi Haninah cited the report of  that "the Lord smelled the sweet savor; and ... said ... 'I will not again curse the ground any more for man's sake,'" for the proposition that those who allow themselves to be pacified when drinking wine possess some of the characteristics of the Creator.

Rav Awira (or some say Rabbi Joshua ben Levi) taught that the Evil Inclination (yetzer hara) has seven names.

Genesis chapter 9 
The Rabbis interpreted  to set forth seven Noahide laws binding on all people: (1) to set up courts of justice, (2) not to commit idolatry, (3) not to commit blasphemy, (4) not to commit sexual immorality, (5) not to commit bloodshed (see ), (6) not to commit robbery, and (7) not to eat flesh cut from a living animal (see ). Rabbi Hanina taught that they were also commanded not to consume blood from a living animal. Rabbi Leazar taught that they were also commanded not to cross-breed animals. Rabbi Simeon taught that they were also commanded not to commit witchcraft. Rabbi Johanan taught that they were also commanded not to emasculate animals. And Rabbi Assi taught that the children of Noah were also prohibited to do anything stated in  "There shall not be found among you any one that makes his son or his daughter to pass through the fire, one that uses divination, a soothsayer, or an enchanter, or a sorcerer, or a charmer, or one that consults a ghost or a familiar spirit, or a necromancer." The Tosefta instructed that Israelites should not tempt anyone to violate a Noahide law.

Rabbi Shimon ben Eleazar deduced from  that even a one-day-old child scares small animals, but said that the corpse of even the giant Og of Bashan would need to be guarded from weasels and rats.

Rabbi Tanhum ben Hanilai compared the laws of kashrut to the case of a physician who went to visit two patients, one whom the physician judged would live, and the other whom the physician judged would die. To the one who would live, the physician gave orders about what to eat and what not to eat. On the other hand, the physician told the one who would die to eat whatever the patient wanted.

In explanation, the Gemara quoted  “Who can bring a pure thing out of an impure? Is it not the One?” For God can bring a pure thing, such as milk, out of an impure thing, such as blood.

Similarly, the Tosefta cited  for the proposition that just as one is liable for injury done to another, so is one liable for injury done to one's self. And Rabbi Simeon ben Eleazar said in the name of Rabbi Hilpai ben Agra, which he said in the name of Rabbi Johanan ben Nuri, that if one pulled out one's own hair, tore one's own clothing, broke one's utensils, or scattered one's coins, in a fit of anger, it should be seen as if that person did an act of service for an idol.

The Midrash also read , "And surely (ve-ach) your blood of your lives will I require," to include one who strangles one's self. But the Midrash taught that the principle of retribution for suicide did not apply to one in the plight of Saul (who committed suicide to save himself from the Philistines) or one like Hananiah, Mishael, and Azariah (who risked their lives to sanctify God's name), as the word , ach implies a limitation on the general rule.

A Midrash read , "at the hand of every beast will I require it," to teach that when a murder is committed in secret, even if no one knows of it and a court cannot punish the murderer, still God will avenge the victim's blood.

Rabbi Akiva said that it demonstrated the value of human beings that God created us in God's image, and that it was an act of still greater love that God let us know (in ) that God had created us in God's image. And Rabbi Akiva also said that whoever spills blood diminishes the Divine image. Rabbi Eleazar ben Azariah and Ben Azzai both said that whoever does not have children diminishes the Divine image as demonstrated by proximity of the notice that God created us in God's image and the command to be fruitful and multiply. Similarly, a Midrash taught that some say a man without a wife even impairs the Divine likeness, as  says, "For in the image of God made He man," and immediately thereafter  says, "And you, be fruitful, and multiply (implying that the former is impaired if one does not fulfill the latter).

Rabbi Jacob bar Aha said in the name of Rav Assi that Abraham asked God whether God would wipe out Abraham's descendants as God had destroyed the generation of the Flood. Abraham asked God if Abraham's descendants should sin before God, would God do to them as God did to the generation of the Flood (in ) and the generation of the Dispersion (in Genesis in ). God told Abraham that God would not. Abraham then asked God (as reported in ), "Let me know how I shall inherit it." God answered by instructing Abraham (as reported in ), "Take Me a heifer of three years old, and a she-goat of three years old" (which Abraham was to sacrifice to God). Abraham acknowledged to God that this means of atonement through sacrifice would hold good while a sacrificial shrine remained in being, but Abraham pressed God what would become of his descendants when the Temple would no longer exist. God replied that God had already long ago provided for Abraham's descendants in the Torah the order of the sacrifices, and whenever they read it, God would deem it as if they had offered them before God, and God would grant them pardon for all their iniquities.

Rabbi Meir taught that while it was certain that God would never again flood the world with water, God might bring a flood of fire and brimstone, as God brought upon Sodom and Gomorrah.

The Mishnah taught that the rainbow (of ) was one of ten miraculous things that God created on the sixth day of creation at twilight on the eve of the Sabbath. Rabbi Jose and Rabbi Judah disagreed whether verses of remembrance referring to the rainbow needed to be said together or individually.

The Gemara helped explain why (as  reports) God chose a rainbow as the symbol of God's promise. The Mishnah taught with regard to those who take no thought for the honor of their Maker, that it would have been better if they had not been born. Rabbi Abba read this Mishnah to refer to those who stare at a rainbow, while Rav Joseph said that it refers to those who commit transgressions in secret. The Gemara explained that those who stare at a rainbow affront God's honor, as  compares God's appearance to that of a rainbow: "As the appearance of the bow that is in the cloud in the day, so was the appearance of the brightness round about. This was the appearance of the likeness of the glory of the Lord." Thus those who stare at a rainbow behave as if they were staring directly at God. Similarly, Rabbi Judah ben Rabbi Nahmani, the speaker for Resh Lakish, taught that because  compares God's appearance to that of a rainbow, staring at the rainbow harms one's eyesight.

The Talmud deduced two possible explanations (attributed to Rav and Rabbi Samuel) for what Ham did to Noah to warrant Noah's curse of Canaan. According to one explanation, Ham castrated Noah, while the other says that Ham sexually abused Noah. The textual argument for castration goes this way: Since Noah cursed Ham by his fourth son Canaan, Ham must have injured Noah with respect to a fourth son, by emasculating him, thus depriving Noah of the possibility of a fourth son. Thus this explanation deduced that similar abuse must have happened each time that the Bible uses the same language.

Genesis chapter 10 
The Baraita rejected the plain meaning of "built," reasoning that Ham would not build a house for his younger son Canaan (in whose land was Hebron) before he built one for his elder son Mizraim (in whose land was Zoan, and  lists (presumably in order of birth) "the sons of Ham: Cush, and Mizraim, and Put, and Canaan." The Baraita also taught that among all the nations, there was none more fertile than Egypt, for  says, "Like the garden of the Lord, like the land of Egypt." And there was no more fertile spot in Egypt than Zoan, where kings lived, for  says of Pharaoh, "his princes are at Zoan." But rocky Hebron was still seven times as fertile as lush Zoan.

One held that his name was actually Nimrod, and  calls him Amraphel because he ordered Abraham to be cast into a burning furnace (and thus the name Amraphel reflects the words for "he said" (amar) and "he cast" (hipil)). But the other held that his name was actually Amraphel, and  calls him Nimrod because he led the world in rebellion against God (and thus the name Nimrod reflects the word for "he led in rebellion" (himrid)).

Genesis chapter 11 
Rabbi Leazar in the name of Rabbi Jose bar Zimra found the story of the generation of the Dispersion (reported in ) reflected in the words of  "Slay them not, lest my people forget, make them wander to and fro by Your power, and bring them down, O Lord, our Shield, for the sin of their mouth, and the words of their lips." Rabbi Leazar told in the name of Rabbi Jose bar Zimra that the people of Israel asked God: "Slay them [the generation of Dispersion] not, lest my people forget" and the generations that followed them forget. "Make them wander to and fro by Your power" — cast them away. "And bring them down" from the top of their tower to the land. But for us, said Israel, may "The Lord be our shield." "For the sin of their mouth" — for the sin that the generation of the Dispersion uttered when they said that once in every 1,656 years (the time from the Creation to the Flood), the Firmament disintegrates (thus not recognizing that God unleashed the Flood because of human evil). Therefore, they said, people should make supports for the Firmament, one in the north, one in the south, one in the west, and the Tower of Babel in the east. "And the word of their lips" reflects that they said this to each other by virtue of the "one language" that  reports that they had.

The Tosefta taught that the men of the Tower of Babel acted arrogantly before God only because God had been so good to them (in ) as to give them a single language and allow them to settle in Shinar. And as usage elsewhere indicated that "settle" meant "eat and drink" (see ), this eating and drinking was what led them to say (in ) that they wanted to build the Tower.

So Rav Ashi replied that wa-yehi sometimes presages misfortune, and sometimes it does not, but the expression "and it came to pass in the days of" always presages misfortune.

Rabbi Johanan said in the name of Rabbi Eleazar the son of Rabbi Simeon that wherever you find the words of Rabbi Eleazar the son of Rabbi Jose the Galilean in an Aggadah, make your ear like a funnel (to receive the teaching).

The Mishnah taught that the generation of the dispersion has no portion in the world to come. The Gemara asked what they did to justify this punishment. The scholars of the academy of Rav Shila taught that they sought to build a tower, ascend to heaven, and cleave it with axes, that its waters might gush forth. In the academies of the Land of Israel, they laughed at this, arguing that if the generation of the dispersion had sought to do so, they should have built the tower on a mountain. Rabbi Jeremiah bar Eleazar taught that the generation of the dispersion split into three parties. One party sought to ascend to heaven and dwell there. The second party sought to ascend to heaven and serve idols. And the third party sought to ascend and wage war with God. God scattered the party that proposed to ascend and dwell there. God turned into apes, spirits, devils, and night-demons the party that sought to ascend and wage war with God. It was taught in a Baraita that Rabbi Nathan said that the generation of the dispersion were all bent on idolatry. For  says, "let us make us a name," while  says, "and make no mention of the name of other gods." Rabbi Jonathan taught that a third of the tower was burned, a third sank into the earth, and a third still stood at his time. Rav taught that the atmosphere of the tower caused forgetfulness. Rav Joseph taught that Babylon and the neighboring city of Borsif were both evil omens for the Torah, because one soon forgets one's learning there. Rabbi Assi said that the name "Borsif" means "an empty pit" (bor shafi), for it empties one of knowledge.

Rabbi Phineas taught that the land of Babel had no stones with which to build the city and the tower. So they baked bricks until they built the tower seven miles high. The tower had ramps on its east and its west. Laborers took up the bricks on the eastern ramp, and people descended on the western ramp. If a man fell and died, the laborers paid him no heed, but if a brick fell, they sat and wept, asking when another brick would come in its stead.

Rabbi Simeon bar Yohai taught that the report of  that "the Lord came down to see the city and the tower" was one of ten instances when the Torah reports that God descended.

Rabbi Judah and Rabbi Nehemiah disagreed over how to interpret , “And the Lord said: ‘Behold, they are one people, and they have all one language; and this is what they begin to do; and now nothing will be withheld from them, which they purpose to do.’” Rabbi Judah interpreted the words, “Behold, they are one people, and they have all one language,” to mean that because the people lived in unity, if they had repented, God would have accepted them. But Rabbi Nehemiah explained that it was because “they are one people, and they have all one language,” that they rebelled against God.

Rabbi Johanan taught that wherever heretics have taken Biblical passages as grounds for their heresy, another passage nearby provides the refutation. Thus (the heretics questioned the use of the plural with regard to God in ): "Come, let us go down and there confound their language."

Rabbi Simeon told that God called to the 70 angels who surround the throne of God's glory and said, "Let us descend and let us confuse the 70 nations (that made up the world) and the 70 languages." Rabbi Simeon taught that , "When the Most High gave to the nations their inheritance," reports that they cast lots among them. God's lot fell upon Abraham and his descendants, as  reports, "For the Lord's portion is his people; Jacob is the lot of his inheritance." God said that God's soul lives by the portion and lot that fell to God, as  says, "The lots have fallen to me in pleasures; yea, I have a goodly heritage." God then descended with the 70 angels who surround the throne of God's glory and they confused the speech of humankind into 70 nations and 70 languages.

The Sages taught that the God who punished the generation of the Flood and the generation of the Dispersion would take vengeance on people who renege on their word after money has been paid.

The Gemara asked what the name Babel (which can mean "to mix" or "confound," as in ) connotes. Rabbi Johanan answered that the study of Scripture, Mishnah, and Talmud was intermingled (in the study reported in the Babylonian Talmud).

The Mishnah observed that there were ten generations from Adam to Noah (enumerated in ), to make known God’s long-suffering; for all those generations kept on provoking God, until God brought upon them the waters of the Flood. And there were also ten generations from Noah to Abraham (enumerated in ), to make known God’s long-suffering; for all those generations kept on provoking God, until Abraham came and received the reward of all of them.

The Mishnah taught that Abraham suffered ten trials and withstood them all, demonstrating how great Abraham's love was for God. The Avot of Rabbi Natan taught that two trials were at the time he was bidden to leave Haran, two were with his two sons, two were with his two wives, one was in the wars of the Kings, one was at the covenant between the pieces, one was in Ur of the Chaldees (where, according to a tradition, he was thrown into a furnace and came out unharmed), and one was the covenant of circumcision. Similarly, the Pirke De-Rabbi Eliezer counted as the 10 trials (1) when Abraham was a child and all the magnates of the kingdom and the magicians sought to kill him (see below), (2) when he was put into prison for ten years and cast into the furnace of fire, (3) his migration from his father's house and from the land of his birth, (4) the famine, (5) when Sarah his wife was taken to be Pharaoh's wife, (6) when the kings came against him to slay him, (7) when (in the words of ) "the word of the Lord came to Abram in a vision," (8) when Abram was 99 years old and God asked him to circumcise himself, (9) when Sarah asked Abraham (in the words of ) to "Cast out this bondwoman and her son," and (10) the binding of Isaac.

The Pirke De-Rabbi Eliezer taught that the first trial was when Abram was born, and all the magnates of the kingdom and the magicians sought to kill him. Abram's family hid Abram in a cave for 13 years without seeing the sun or moon. After 13 years, Abram came out speaking the holy language, Hebrew, and he despised idols and held in abomination the graven images, and he trusted in God, saying (in the words of ): "Blessed is the man who trusts in You." In the second trial, Abram was put in prison for ten years — three years in Kuthi, seven years in Budri. After ten years, they brought him out and cast him into the furnace of fire, and God delivered him from the furnace of fire, as  says, "And He said to him, 'I am the Lord who brought you out of the furnace of the Chaldees." Similarly,  reports, "You are the Lord the God, who did choose Abram, and brought him forth out of the furnace of the Chaldees." The third trial was Abram's migration from his father's house and from the land of his birth. God brought him to Haran, and there his father Terah died, and Athrai his mother. The Pirke De-Rabbi Eliezer taught that migration is harder for a human than for any other creature. And  tells of his migration when it says, "Now the Lord said to Abram, 'Get out.'"

The Gemara taught that Sarah was one of seven prophetesses who prophesied to Israel and neither took away from nor added anything to what is written in the Torah. (The other prophetesses were Miriam, Deborah, Hannah, Abigail, Huldah, and Esther.) Rabbi Isaac taught that Yiscah was Sarah.  called her Yiscah because she discerned (saketah) by means of Divine inspiration, as  reports God instructing Abraham, "In all that Sarah says to you, hearken to her voice." Alternatively,  called her Yiscah because all gazed (sakin) at her beauty.

The Pesikta de-Rav Kahana taught that Sarah was one of seven barren women about whom  says (speaking of God), "He ... makes the barren woman to dwell in her house as a joyful mother of children." The Pesikta de-Rav Kahana also listed Rebekah Rachel, Leah, Manoah's wife, Hannah, and Zion.

Rav Nahman said in the name of Rabbah bar Abbuha that the redundant report, "And Sarai was barren; she had no child," in  demonstrated that Sarah was incapable of procreation because she did not have a womb.

In medieval Jewish interpretation
The parashah is discussed in these medieval Jewish sources:

Genesis chapter 6 

Maimonides taught that God, being incorporeal, is elevated above the use of a sense of sight. Maimonides thus argued that "God
saw" would be more properly translated "it was revealed before God."

Maimonides taught that whenever Scripture relates that God spoke to a person, this took place in a dream or in a prophetic vision.
Thus , "And God said to Noah," reports a prophecy proclaimed by Noah acting as a prophet.

Abraham ibn Ezra wrote that , "But I will establish My covenant," could be read to indicate that God had sworn earlier to Noah that he and his children would not die in the Flood, even though the text had not previously mentioned it. Alternatively, ibn Ezra taught that "But I will establish" meant that God would keep God's oath. After reviewing Ibn Ezra's analysis, Nachmanides argued that the expression, "And I will establish My covenant," meant that when the Flood came, God's covenant would be established with Noah so that he and his family and two of all the animals would come into the Ark and remain alive, and "covenant" meant God's word when God decrees something without any condition and fulfills it. God thus commanded that the covenant exist and be with the righteous Noah.

Maimonides taught that before Abraham's birth, only a very few people recognized or knew God in the world, among them Enoch, Methuselah, Noah, Shem, and Eber.

The Zohar compared Moses to Noah and found Moses superior. Moses protested that the world would say that he had killed Israel and did to them as Noah did to his generation. For when God bade Noah to save himself and his household from the Flood, Noah did not intercede on behalf of his generation, but let them perish. It is for this reason that Scripture names the waters of the Flood after Noah, as  says, “For this is as the waters of Noah to me.” Thus, Moses sought mercy for his people, and God indeed showed them mercy.

Genesis chapter 7 

The Zohar teaches that the waters did not touch the Land of Israel, that is, Jerusalem.

Genesis chapter 8 
Reading , “And God remembered Noah,” Saadia Gaon taught that Scripture designates the deliverance of the human world from a painful situation as a recollection on the part of God. Saadia argued that the verse does not permit the use of the term “forgetfulness” in connection with God's desisting from delivering God's creatures.

The Midrash ha-Ne'lam (The Midrash of the Concealed) told that when Noah left the Ark and saw the terrible destruction all around, he wept and cried out to God that God should have shown compassion for God's creatures. But as soon as Noah heard that he would be saved in the Ark, the evil of the world did not touch his heart. Noah built the Ark and saved himself! Now that the world had been destroyed, Noah opened his mouth before God with prayers and supplications! When Noah realized his mistake, he offered sacrifices, as  says, “And Noah built an altar to the Lord; and took of every clean beast, and of every clean fowl, and offered burnt-offerings on the altar.” Similarly, the Midrash ha-Ne'lam contrasted Noah with the righteous heroes who arose for Israel afterward. Noah did not shield his generation and did not pray for them as Abraham did for his. Abraham thought that there were ten in the city, counting Lot and his wife, his daughters and sons-in-law, and that is why he beseeched no further.

Baḥya explained that necessity brought people to anthropomorphize God and describe God in terms of human attributes so that human listeners could grasp God in their minds. After doing so, people can learn that such description was only metaphorical, and that the truth is too fine, too sublime, too exalted, and too remote from the ability and powers of human minds to grasp. Baḥya advised wise thinkers to endeavor to remove the husk of the terms and their corporeality and ascend in their minds step by step to reach the true intended meaning according to the power and ability of their minds to grasp. Baḥya cautioned that one must be careful not to take descriptions of God's attributes literally or in a physical sense. Rather, one must know that they are metaphors, geared to what we are capable of grasping with our powers of understanding, because of our urgent need to know God. But God is infinitely greater and loftier than all of these attributes.

Maimonides read  to refer to the evil inclination (yetzer ha-ra). Maimonides taught that the three terms — the adversary (ha-satan), the evil inclination (yetzer ha-ra), and the angel of death — all designate the same thing. And actions ascribed to these three are in reality the actions of one and the same agent. Thus, the adversary turns people away from the way of truth, and leads them astray in the way of error. Maimonides reported that the Sages also said that people receive the evil inclination at birth, for  says, "at the door sin crouches," and  says, "And the imagination of the heart of man is evil from his youth." The good inclination, however, is developed. Maimonides taught that the Sages refer to the evil inclination and the good inclination when they tell that every person is accompanied by two angels, one on the right side and one on the left, one good and one bad.

Genesis chapter 9 
Baḥya ibn Paquda argued that one proof in creation of God's existence is that out of God's abounding goodness to mankind, God put the fear of humans into dangerous wild creatures, as  says, "And the fear of you and the dread of you shall be upon every beast of the earth."

Saadia Gaon read , "Whoso sheds man's blood, by man shall his blood be shed," to explain why the death penalty was not imposed on Cain for killing Abel, for at the time of that murder, neither judge or witnesses yet existed to impose the penalty.

Genesis chapter 11 

Genesis chapters 11–22 
In their commentaries to Mishnah Avot 5:3 (see "In classical rabbinic interpretation" above), Rashi and Maimonides differed on what 10 trials Abraham faced:

In modern interpretation 
The parashah is discussed in these modern sources:

Genesis chapters 5–11 
Victor P. Hamilton observed that genealogies bracket narrative blocks in the opening chapters of Genesis.

1A:  genealogy (Noah's sons)
1B:  narrative (the sons of God)
1A1:  genealogy (Noah's sons)

2A:  genealogy (Noah's sons)
2B:  narrative (the Flood)
2A1:  genealogy (Noah's sons)

3A:  genealogy (Shemites)
3B:  narrative (Tower of Babel)
3A1:  genealogy (Shemites)

Genesis chapter 6 
Ephraim Speiser contrasted the reason for the Flood given by the Jahwist in  — that God “regretted” with “sorrow in His heart” that man had not been able to master his evil impulses — with the reason given by the Priestly source in  — that the world was lawless and thus had to be destroyed.

Genesis chapter 7 
Speiser read , 12, 10, and 12, to reflect the Jahwist's chronology that the rains came down 40 days and nights, and the waters disappeared after 3 times 7 days, the whole deluge lasting thus 61 days.

Genesis chapter 8 
Walter Brueggemann wrote that God's promise in  inverts the destructive action of the Flood story and marks the decisive end of the Genesis pre-history.

Genesis chapter 9 
Government and religion, Mendelssohn asserted, have for their object the promotion, by means of public measures, of human felicity in this life and in the life to come. Both act upon people's convictions and actions, on principles and their application; the state, by means of reasons based on the relations between people, or between people and nature, and religion by means of reasons based on the relations between people and God. The state treats people as the immortal children of the earth; religion treats people as the image of their Creator.

Spinoza concluded that God's decrees and mandates, and consequently God's Providence, are merely the order of nature, and when Scripture describes an event as accomplished by God or God's will, we must understand merely that it was in accordance with the law and order of nature, not that nature had for a time ceased to act, or that nature's order was temporarily interrupted.

Genesis chapter 10 
Spinoza noted that Abraham ibn Ezra alluded to a difficulty by noting that if, as  indicates, Canaan first settled the land, then the Canaanites still possessed those territories during the time of Moses. Spinoza deduced that the person who wrote , "the Canaanite was then in the land," must thus have written at a time when the Canaanites had been driven out and no longer possessed the land, and thus after the death of Moses. Spinoza concluded that Moses did not write the Torah, but someone who lived long after him, and that the book that Moses wrote was something different from any now extant.

Genesis chapter 11 
Brueggemann argued that  was as symmetrically structured as any narrative since , showing the conflict of human resolve with God's resolve:

A:  "Whole earth ... one language"
B:  Human words and actions
C:  "Come let us"
B1:  God's words and actions
C1:  "Come let us"
A1:  "The language of all the earth ... all the earth"

Umberto Cassuto suggested that the Tower of Babel story in  reflects an earlier Israelite poem that regarded with a smile the boastful pride of the Babylonians in their city, temple, and ziggurat. Cassuto deduced that Israelites composed the poem when the city and tower were already in ruins, and he posited that they were written in the centuries after the fall of the First Babylonian dynasty and the destruction of Babylon by the Hittites in the middle of the 16th century B.C.E., during which Israelites remembered the bragging of the Babylonians with derision.

In critical analysis 

Some scholars who follow the Documentary Hypothesis find evidence of four separate sources in the parashah. Thus some scholars consider the parashah to weave together two Flood story accounts composed by the Jahwist (sometimes abbreviated J) who wrote possibly as early as the 10th century BCE and the Priestly source who wrote in the 6th or 5th century BCE. For a similar distribution of verses, see the display of Genesis according to the Documentary Hypothesis at Wikiversity.

Gary Rendsburg, however, notes that the Flood story has many similarities with the Epic of Gilgamesh. He argues that several sources would be unlikely to track these plot elements from the Epic of Gilgamesh independently. Thus, Rendsburg argues that the Flood story was composed as a unified whole.

Commandments 
Maimonides cited the parashah for one positive commandment:
To "be fruitful and multiply"

The Kitzur Shulchan Aruch taught that one overrides the Shabbat as well as other commandments (except for idol worship, incest, and murder) if there is danger to life and one who hastens to disregard the Sabbath for an ill person who is in danger is praiseworthy.

For God created the world for a single individual, Adam, so anyone who destroys a soul destroys a whole world. The Kitzur Shulchan Aruch therefore taught that Jews should not carry out for one who committed suicide anything to honor that person, but Jews should bury the body after cleansing and dressing it in a shroud. The principle is that everything for honoring the living relatives should be done for them, as opposed to for the honor of the person who committed suicide.

The Kitzur Shulchan Aruch taught that upon arising in the morning, one should wash one's face in honor of one's Creator, as  states, "for in the image of God made He man."

In the liturgy 

And then they encounter the discussion of the ten generations from Adam to the Flood and then the ten generations from Noah to Abraham (enumerated in ) as they study chapter 5 of Pirkei Avot thereafter.

Haftarah 
A haftarah is a text selected from the books of Nevi'im ("The Prophets") that is read publicly in the synagogue after the reading of the Torah on Sabbath and holiday mornings. The haftarah usually has a thematic link to the Torah reading that precedes it.

The specific text read following Parashah Noach varies according to different traditions within Judaism. Examples are:
for Ashkenazi Jews,and Mizrahi Jews: 
for Sephardi Jews: 
for Yemenite Jews: 
for Italian Jews and some Yemenite communities: 
for Karaite Jews: 
for Frankfurt am Main and Chabad Lubavitch:

Connection to the parashah 
The parashah and haftarah both tell the power of God's covenant. The parashah and the haftarah both report God's covenant with Noah never again to destroy the earth by flood. In the parashah and the haftarah, God confesses to anger at human transgression. In the wake of God's punishment, and  all use the words "no ... more" (lo' 'od). The "righteousness" of Israel's children in  echoes that Noah is "righteous" in his age in ..

See also 

Curse of Ham
Genesis flood narrative
Noahide laws
Noah in rabbinic literature

Notes

Further reading 
The parashah has parallels or is discussed in these sources:

Ancient 
Atra-Hasis. Mesopotamia, 18th century BCE. In, e.g., W.G. Lambert and A.R. Millard, Atra-Hasis: The Babylonian Story of the Flood. Winona Lake, Indiana: Eisenbrauns, 1999.
Epic of Gilgamesh. Tablet 11. Mesopotamia, 14th–11th century BCE. In e.g. James B. Pritchard. Ancient Near Eastern Texts Relating to the Old Testament, pages 93–95. Princeton: Princeton University Press, 1969.

Ovid. Metamorphoses, book 1, lines 262–448. Rome, 8 CE. In, e.g., Ovid. Metamorphoses: The New, Annotated Edition. Translated by Rolfe Humphries, annotated by Joseph D. Reed, pages 11–16, 404–05. Bloomington, Indiana: Indiana University Press, 2018. (flood).

Biblical 
 (to be fruitful);  (God's destruction of Sodom and Gomorrah);  (to be fruitful).
(God's destruction of Egypt's firstborn).
.
; .
 (God's destruction of Jerusalem's sinners);  (Noah as righteous intercessor).

Early nonrabbinic 
The Book of Noah. Jerusalem, early 2nd century BCE.
The Genesis Apocryphon. Dead Sea scroll 1Q20. Land of Israel, 1st century BCE. In Géza Vermes. The Complete Dead Sea Scrolls in English, pages 448, 450–53. New York: Penguin Press, 1997.
Josephus, Antiquities of the Jews book 1, chapter 3, paragraphs 2–3, 5, 7–8 ; chapter 4, paragraph 1 ; chapter 6, paragraphs 1, 3–5. Circa 93–94. In, e.g., The Works of Josephus: Complete and Unabridged, New Updated Edition. Translated by William Whiston, pages 32–38. Peabody, Massachusetts: Hendrickson Publishers, 1987.
Qur'an 3:33–34; 4:163; 6:84; 7:59–64; 9:70; 71:1–28. Arabia, 7th century.

Classical rabbinic 
Mishnah: Chagigah 2:1; Nedarim 3:11; Bava Metzia 4:2; Sanhedrin 10:3; Avot 3:14, 5:3, 6. Land of Israel, circa 200 CE. In, e.g., The Mishnah: A New Translation. Translated by Jacob Neusner, pages 330, 411–12, 537, 604–05, 680, 686. New Haven: Yale University Press, 1988.
Tosefta: Demai 2:24; Shabbat 17:19; Rosh Hashanah 1:3, 2:14; Taanit 2:13; Yevamot 8:7; Sotah 3:6–10, 4:11, 10:3; Bava Kamma 9:31; Sanhedrin 13:6–7; Avodah Zarah 8:4–6. Land of Israel, circa 250 CE. In, e.g., The Tosefta: Translated from the Hebrew, with a New Introduction. Translated by Jacob Neusner, volume 1, pages 88–89, 425–26, 605, 616, 628, 712–13, 840–42, 848, 876; volume 2, pages 1008, 1291–93. Peabody, Massachusetts: Hendrickson Publishers, 2002.
Sefer HaRazim, preface . Late 3rd or early 4th centuries. In, e.g., Michael A. Morgan. Sepher Ha-Razim: The Book of Mysteries, pages 17–19. Atlanta: Society of Biblical Literature, 1983.
Sifra 34:1, 4; 35:2; 93:1; 99:5; 108:2; 109:3; 243:1. Land of Israel, 4th century CE. In, e.g., Sifra: An Analytical Translation. Translated by Jacob Neusner, volume 1, pages 211, 214–15, 219; volume 2, pages 87, 134, 173, 178; volume 3, page 286. Atlanta: Scholars Press, 1988.
Jerusalem Talmud: Berakhot 40a, 45a; Pesachim 2a, 78b; Rosh Hashanah 2a, 22a; Taanit 4a, 7b; Megillah 12a, 18a; Moed Katan 17a; Yevamot 44a; Sotah 46b; Kiddushin 2a; Bava Metzia 13b; Sanhedrin 30a, 68a; Makkot 9a. Tiberias, Land of Israel, circa 400 CE. In, e.g., Talmud Yerushalmi. Edited by Chaim Malinowitz, Yisroel Simcha Schorr, and Mordechai Marcus, volumes 1, 18–19, 24–26, 28, 30, 37, 40, 42, 44–45, 49. Brooklyn: Mesorah Publications, 2005–2019. And in, e.g., The Jerusalem Talmud: A Translation and Commentary. Edited by Jacob Neusner and translated by Jacob Neusner, Tzvee Zahavy, B. Barry Levy, and Edward Goldman. Peabody, Massachusetts: Hendrickson Publishers, 2009.
Genesis Rabbah 2:3; 4:6; 5:1; 6:4; 14:3; 16:6; 17:2; 22:3, 12; 23:3, 7; 24:3; 25:2; 26:1–4; 28:8; 30:1–38:14; 39:7; 42:4; 49:2; 50:8; 53:5. Land of Israel, 5th century. In, e.g., Midrash Rabbah: Genesis. Translated by Harry Freedman and Maurice Simon, volume 1, pages 16, 32, 35, 44, 112, 131–33, 181, 191, 194, 197, 200, 207, 209–12, 229, 233–312, 315, 346, 421–22, 439, 464; volume 2, pages 511, 522, 531, 546, 561, 612, 669, 689. London: Soncino Press, 1939.
Leviticus Rabbah 17:5. Land of Israel, 5th century. In, e.g., Midrash Rabbah: Leviticus. Translated by Harry Freedman and Maurice Simon. London: Soncino Press, 1939.

Babylonian Talmud: Berakhot 25b, 40a; Shabbat 31b, 109a, 113b, 137a, 150a, 151b; Eruvin 18a–b, 53a, 65a; Pesachim 3a, 54a; Yoma 9b–10a, 52b, 75a, 76a, 85a; Sukkah 52a; Rosh Hashanah 10b, 11b–12a; Taanit 19a, 27b; Megillah 9b, 10b, 14a, 17a, 31b; Moed Katan 25b; Chagigah 11b–12a, 16a; Yevamot 62a, 63b, 64b; Ketubot 8a, 77b, 112a; Sotah 12a, 34b, 45b; Kiddushin 13a, 30b; Bava Kamma 91b; Bava Metzia 44a, 106b; Bava Batra 16b, 74a, 123a; Sanhedrin 17a, 24a, 38b, 44a, 56a–57b, 58b–59b, 69b–70a, 72b, 84b, 91a, 100b, 108a–09a; Makkot 8b, 11a; Shevuot 36a; Avodah Zarah 5a–6a, 11b, 19a, 23b, 51a; Horayot 13a; Zevachim 108b, 113b, 115b–16a; Chullin 23a, 89a, 102a, 139b; Bekhorot 46b, 57a; Temurah 28b; Keritot 6b; Meilah 16a. Sasanian Empire, 6th century. In, e.g., Talmud Bavli. Edited by Yisroel Simcha Schorr, Chaim Malinowitz, and Mordechai Marcus, 72 volumes. Brooklyn: Mesorah Pubs., 2006.

Medieval 
Rashi. Commentary. Genesis 6–11. Troyes, France, late 11th century. In, e.g., Rashi. The Torah: With Rashi's Commentary Translated, Annotated, and Elucidated. Translated and annotated by Yisrael Isser Zvi Herczeg, volume 1, pages 65–114. Brooklyn: Mesorah Publications, 1995.
Abraham ibn Ezra. Commentary on the Torah. Mid-12th century. In, e.g., Ibn Ezra's Commentary on the Pentateuch: Genesis (Bereshit). Translated and annotated by H. Norman Strickman and Arthur M. Silver, pages 98–148. New York: Menorah Publishing Company, 1988.

Maimonides. Mishneh Torah: Hilchot Avodat Kochavim V'Chukkoteihem (The Laws of the Worship of Stars and their Statutes), chapter 1, halachah 2. Egypt, circa 1170–1180. In, e.g., Mishneh Torah: Hilchot Avodat Kochavim V'Chukkoteihem: The Laws of the Worship of Stars and their Statutes. Translated by Eliyahu Touger, volume 3, pages 16–21. New York: Moznaim Publishing, 1990. .
Maimonides. The Guide for the Perplexed, part 1, chapters 6, 10, 47–48; part 2, chapter 41; part 3, chapter 22. Cairo, Egypt, 1190. In, e.g., Moses Maimonides. The Guide for the Perplexed. Translated by Michael Friedländer, pages 19, 23, 63–65, 235–36, 298–99. New York: Dover Publications, 1956.
Hezekiah ben Manoah. Hizkuni. France, circa 1240. In, e.g., Chizkiyahu ben Manoach. Chizkuni: Torah Commentary. Translated and annotated by Eliyahu Munk, volume 1, pages 66–102. Jerusalem: Ktav Publishers, 2013.
Nachmanides. Commentary on the Torah. Jerusalem, circa 1270. In, e.g., Ramban (Nachmanides): Commentary on the Torah: Genesis. Translated by Charles B. Chavel, volume 1, pages 105–63. New York: Shilo Publishing House, 1971.
Midrash ha-Ne'lam (The Midrash of the Concealed). Spain, 13th century. In Zohar Chadash, pages 20d–24a. Salonika, 1597. In, e.g., The Zohar: Pritzker Edition. Translation and commentary by Nathan Wolski, volume 10, pages 223–74. Stanford, California: Stanford University Press, 2016.
Zohar, part 1, pages 59b–76b. Spain, late 13th century. In, e.g., The Zohar. Translated by Harry Sperling and Maurice Simon, volume 1, pages 192–259. London: Soncino Press, 1934. And in, e.g., The Zohar: Pritzker Edition. Translation and commentary by Daniel C. Matt, volume 1, pages 339–450. Stanford, California: Stanford University Press, 2004.
Bahya ben Asher. Commentary on the Torah. Spain, early 14th century. In, e.g., Midrash Rabbeinu Bachya: Torah Commentary by Rabbi Bachya ben Asher. Translated and annotated by Eliyahu Munk, volume 1, pages 163–215. Jerusalem: Lambda Publishers, 2003.
Isaac ben Moses Arama. Akedat Yizhak (The Binding of Isaac). Late 15th century. In, e.g., Yitzchak Arama. Akeydat Yitzchak: Commentary of Rabbi Yitzchak Arama on the Torah. Translated and condensed by Eliyahu Munk, volume 1, pages 63–92. New York, Lambda Publishers, 2001.

Modern 
Isaac Abravanel. Commentary on the Torah. Italy, between 1492 and 1509. In, e.g., Abarbanel: Selected Commentaries on the Torah: Volume 1: Bereishis/Genesis. Translated and annotated by Israel Lazar, pages 54–81. Brooklyn: CreateSpace, 2015.
Obadiah ben Jacob Sforno. Commentary on the Torah. Venice, 1567. In, e.g., Sforno: Commentary on the Torah. Translation and explanatory notes by Raphael Pelcovitz, pages 40–61. Brooklyn: Mesorah Publications, 1997.

Moshe Alshich. Commentary on the Torah. Safed, circa 1593. In, e.g., Moshe Alshich. Midrash of Rabbi Moshe Alshich on the Torah. Translated and annotated by Eliyahu Munk, volume 1, pages 62–91. New York, Lambda Publishers, 2000.
Menasseh ben Israel. El Conciliador (The Conciliator). Amsterdam, 1632. In The Conciliator of R. Manasseh Ben Israel: A Reconcilement of the Apparent Contradictions in Holy Scripture: To Which Are Added Explanatory Notes, and Biographical Notices of the Quoted Authorities. Translated by Elias Hiam Lindo, pages 31–35, 37–49. London, 1842. Reprinted by, e.g., Nabu Press, 2010.

Avraham Yehoshua Heschel. Commentaries on the Torah. Cracow, Poland, mid 17th century. Compiled as Chanukat HaTorah. Edited by Chanoch Henoch Erzohn. Piotrkow, Poland, 1900. In Avraham Yehoshua Heschel. Chanukas HaTorah: Mystical Insights of Rav Avraham Yehoshua Heschel on Chumash. Translated by Avraham Peretz Friedman, pages 41–47. Southfield, Michigan: Targum Press/Feldheim Publishers, 2004.
Thomas Hobbes. Leviathan, part 3, chapters 34, 38. England, 1651. Reprint edited by C. B. Macpherson, pages 430–31, 486. Harmondsworth, England: Penguin Classics, 1982.
Baruch Spinoza. Theologico-Political Treatise, chapters 6, 8. Amsterdam, 1670. In, e.g., Baruch Spinoza. Theological-Political Treatise. Translated by Samuel Shirley, pages 78–79, 106–07. Indianapolis: Hackett Publishing Company, second edition, 2001.

Chaim ibn Attar. Ohr ha-Chaim. Venice, 1742. In Chayim ben Attar. Or Hachayim: Commentary on the Torah. Translated by Eliyahu Munk, volume 1, pages 92–117. Brooklyn: Lambda Publishers, 1999.
Moses Mendelssohn.Jerusalem, § 1. Berlin, 1783. In Jerusalem: Or on Religious Power and Judaism. Translated by Allan Arkush; introduction and commentary by Alexander Altmann, page 70. Hanover, New Hampshire: Brandeis University Press, 1983.

Mary Shelley. Frankenstein; or, The Modern Prometheus, chapter 15. London: Lackington, Hughes, Harding, Mavor, & Jones, 1818.
"Mary Don't You Weep." United States, 19th century.

Emily Dickinson. Poem 48 (Once more, my now bewildered Dove). Circa 1858. Poem 403 (The Winters are so short —). Circa 1862. Poem 1473 (We talked with each other about each other). Circa 1879. In The Complete Poems of Emily Dickinson. Edited by Thomas H. Johnson, pages 27, 192, 623. New York: Little, Brown & Co., 1960.
George Eliot. Adam Bede, chapter 30. Edinburgh and London: William Blackwood and Sons, 1859. Reprinted, e.g., edited by Carol A. Martin, page 295. Oxford: Oxford University Press, 2008. (Dinah writes Seth, paraphrasing , “the rains that have fallen, as if the windows of heaven were opened again”).

Samuel David Luzzatto (Shadal). Commentary on the Torah. Padua, 1871. In, e.g., Samuel David Luzzatto. Torah Commentary. Translated and annotated by Eliyahu Munk, volume 1, pages 100–36. New York: Lambda Publishers, 2012.
Malbim. The Torah and the Commandments. Warsaw, 1874–80. In, e.g., Malbim: Rabbenu Meir Leibush ben Yechiel Michel. Malbim : Rabbenu Meir Leibush ben Yechiel Michel : commentary on the Torah. Translated by Zvi Faier; Israel: M.P. Press/Hillel Press, 1982.

Yehudah Aryeh Leib Alter. Sefat Emet. Góra Kalwaria (Ger), Poland, before 1906. Excerpted in The Language of Truth: The Torah Commentary of Sefat Emet. Translated and interpreted by Arthur Green, pages 13–17. Philadelphia: Jewish Publication Society, 1998. Reprinted 2012.
Hermann Cohen. Religion of Reason: Out of the Sources of Judaism. Translated with an introduction by Simon Kaplan; introductory essays by Leo Strauss, pages 117–18, 181. New York: Ungar, 1972. Reprinted Atlanta: Scholars Press, 1995. Originally published as Religion der Vernunft aus den Quellen des Judentums. Leipzig: Gustav Fock, 1919.
Benno Jacob. The First Book of the Bible: Genesis. Translated by Ernest Jacob and Walter Jacob, pages 48–84. Jersey City, New Jersey: KTAV Publishing House, 1974. Originally published as Das erste Buch der Tora, Genesis: Übersetzt und erklärt von Benno Jacob. Berlin: Schocken Verlag, 1934.
Alexander Alan Steinbach. Sabbath Queen: Fifty-four Bible Talks to the Young Based on Each Portion of the Pentateuch, pages 4–7. New York: Behrman's Jewish Book House, 1936.

Thomas Mann. Joseph and His Brothers. Translated by John E. Woods, pages 5, 8–12, 15–16, 19–24, 35–36, 64, 68, 71, 73, 88–89, 107, 109, 154, 172, 183, 323–24, 333, 337, 339–41, 347, 355, 441–42, 447–48, 515, 547, 604–05, 715, 783, 806, 926. New York: Alfred A. Knopf, 2005. Originally published as Joseph und seine Brüder. Stockholm: Bermann-Fischer Verlag, 1943.
Umberto Cassuto. A Commentary on the Book of Genesis: Part Two: From Noah to Abraham. Jerusalem, 1949. Translated by Israel Abrahams, pages 3–287. Jerusalem: The Magnes Press, The Hebrew University, 1964; reprinted 1974.
Jay Macpherson. The Boatman. Oxford University Press Canada, 1957.
Jacob Hoftijzer. "Some Remarks to the Tale of Noah's Drunkenness." Oudtestamentische Studiën, volume 12 (1958): pages 22–27.

James Franklin Armstrong. "A Critical Note on Genesis Vi 16aα." Vetus Testamentum, volume 10, number 1 (1960): pages 328–33.
James Baldwin. The Fire Next Time. 1963. Reprinted Modern Library, 1995.
Walter Orenstein and Hertz Frankel. Torah and Tradition: A Bible Textbook for Jewish Youth: Volume I: Bereishis, pages 13–24. New York: Hebrew Publishing Company, 1964.
Ephraim A. Speiser. Genesis: Introduction, Translation, and Notes, pages 47–81. New York: Anchor Bible, 1964.
Michael C. Astour. "Sabtah and Sabteca: Ethiopian Pharaoh Names in Genesis 10." Journal of Biblical Literature, volume 84, number 4 (1965): pages 422–25.
Walter S. Olson. "Has Science Dated the Biblical Flood?" Zygon, volume 2, number 3 (1967): pages 274–78.
James Barr. "The Image of God in the Book of Genesis — A Study of Terminology." Bulletin of the John Rylands Library, volume 51, number 1 (1968): pages 11–26.
Samuel Noah Kramer. "The 'Babel of Tongues': A Sumerian Version." Journal of the American Oriental Society, volume 88, number 1 (January–March 1968): pages 108–11.
W.G. Lambert and A.R. Millard. Atra–Ḫasīs: The Babylonian Story of the Flood. Oxford: Oxford University Press, 1969. Reprinted Winona Lake, Indiana: Eisenbrauns, 1999.
Eugene J. Fisher. "Gilgamesh and Genesis: The Flood Story in Context." Catholic Biblical Quarterly, volume 32, number 3 (1970): pages 392–403.
David J. A. Clines. "The Image of God in Man." Tyndale Bulletin, volume 19 (1968): pages 53–103.
Frederick W. Bassett. "Noah's Nakedness and the Curse of Canaan: A Case of Incest?" Vetus Testamentum, volume 21, number 2 (1971): pages 232–37.
W. Malcolm Clark. "The Flood and the Structure of the Pre–patriarchal History." Zeitschrift für die Alttestamentliche Wissenschaft, volume 83, number 2 (1971): pages 184–211.
W. Malcolm Clark. "The Righteousness of Noah." Vetus Testamentum, volume 21, number 3 (1971): pages 261–80.
David J. A. Clines. "Noah's Flood: I: The Theology of the Flood Narrative." Faith and Thought, volume 100, number 2 (1972–73): pages 128–42.
Thomas C. Hartman. "Some Thoughts on the Sumerian King List and Genesis 5 and 11B." Journal of Biblical Literature, volume 91, number 1 (March 1972): pages 25–32.
H. Hirsch Cohen. The Drunkenness of Noah. Alabama: University of Alabama, 1974.
Tikva Frymer-Kensky. "What the Babylonian Flood Stories Can and Cannot Teach Us About the Genesis Flood." Biblical Archaeology Review, volume 4, number 4 (1974): pages 32–41.
Isaac M. Kikawada. "The Shape of Genesis 11:1–9." In Rhetorical Criticism: Essays in Honor of James Muilenburg. Edited by Jared J. Jackson and Martin Kessler, pages 18–32. Pittsburgh: Pickwick, 1974.
Albert L. Baumgarten. "Myth and Midrash: Genesis 9:20–29." In Christianity, Judaism and Other Greco-Roman Cults: Studies for Morton Smith at Sixty: Part Three: Judaism Before 70. Edited by Jacob Neusner, pages 55–71. Leiden: Brill Academic Publishers, 1975.
Robert E. Longacre. "The Discourse Structure of the Flood Narrative." In Society of Biblical Literature Abstracts and Seminar Papers, 1976, pages 235–62.
David L. Petersen. "The Yahwist on the Flood." Vetus Testamentum, volume 26, number 4 (1976): pages 438–46.
Tikva Frymer-Kensky. "The Atrahasis Epic and Its Significance for Our Understanding of Genesis 1–9." Biblical Archaeologist, volume 40, number 4 (1977): pages 147–55.
Gerhard Larsson. "Chronological Parallels Between the Creation and the Flood." Vetus Testamentum, volume 27, number 4 (1977): pages 490–92.
Bernhard W. Anderson. "Babel: Unity and Diversity in God's Creation." Currents in Theology and Mission, volume 5, number 2 (1978): pages 69–81.
Peter C. Craigie. The Problem of War in the Old Testament, page 73. Grand Rapids, Michigan: William B. Eerdmans Publishing Company, 1978.
Gerhard F. Hasel. "The Genealogies of Gen 5 and 11 and Their Alleged Babylonian Background."  Andrews University Seminary Studies, volume 6 (1978): pages 361–74.
Robert B. Laurin. "The Tower of Babel Revisited." In Biblical and Near Eastern Studies: Essays in Honor of William Sanford La Sor. Edited by Gary A. Tuttle, pages 142–45. Grand Rapids: Eerdmans, 1978.
Gordon J. Wenham. "The Coherence of the Flood Narrative." Vetus Testamentum, volume 28, number 3 (1978): pages 336–48.
Dale S. DeWitt. "The Historical Background of Genesis 11:1–9: Babel or Ur?" Journal of the Evangelical Theological Society, volume 22, number 1 (1979): pages 15–26.
Mulford Q. Sibley. "Political Science, Moses, and Ancient Hebrew Thought." The Western Political Quarterly, volume 32, number 2 (June 1979): pages 148–49.
Nahum M. Sarna. "The 'Tower of Babel' as a Clue to the Redactional Structuring of Primeval History [Gen. 1–11:9]." In The Bible World: Essays in Honor of Cyrus H. Gordon. Edited by Gary Rendsburg, Ruth Adler, Milton Arfa, and Nathan H. Winter, pages 211–19. New York: Ktav, 1980.
Rosemary Courtney. "Noah's Flood." ETC: A Review of General Semantics, volume 38, number 3 (Fall 1981): pages 269–71.
Nehama Leibowitz. Studies in Bereshit (Genesis), pages 59–108. Jerusalem: The World Zionist Organization, 1981. Reprinted as New Studies in the Weekly Parasha. Lambda Publishers, 2010.
Walter Brueggemann. Genesis: Interpretation: A Bible Commentary for Teaching and Preaching, pages 73–104. Atlanta: John Knox Press, 1982.
Cyrus H. Gordon. "Ebia and Genesis 11." In A Spectrum of Thought: Essays in Honor of Dennis Kinlaw. Edited by Michael L. Peterson, pages 125–34. Wilmore, Kentucky: Francis Asbury Publishing, 1982.

Jack P. Lewis. "Noah and the Flood: In Jewish, Christian, and Muslim Tradition." Biblical Archaeologist, volume 47, number 4 (December 1984): pages 224–39.
Elie Wiesel. "Noah's Warning." Religion & Literature, volume 16, number 1 (winter 1984): pages 3–20. In Sages and Dreamers: Biblical, Talmudic, and Hasidic Portraits and Legends, pages 19–34. New York: Summit Books, 1991.
Isaac M. Kikawada and Arthur Quinn, Before Abraham Was: The Unity of Genesis 1–11. Nashville: Abingdon, 1985.
Pinchas H. Peli. Torah Today: A Renewed Encounter with Scripture, pages 7–10. Washington, D.C.: B'nai B'rith Books, 1987.

Louis H. Feldman. "Josephus' Portrait of Noah and Its Parallels in Philo, Pseudo-Philo's 'Biblical Antiquities,' and Rabbinic Midrashim." Proceedings of the American Academy for Jewish Research, volume 55 (1988): pages 31–57.
Lloyd R. Bailey. Noah: The Person and Story in History and Tradition. University of South Carolina Press, 1989.
Marc Gellman. Does God Have a Big Toe? Stories About Stories in the Bible, pages 27–45. New York: HarperCollins, 1989.
Rolf Rendtorff. "'Covenant' as a Structuring Concept in Genesis and Exodus." Journal of Biblical Literature, volume 108, number 3 (Autumn 1989): pages 385–93.
Nahum M. Sarna. The JPS Torah Commentary: Genesis: The Traditional Hebrew Text with the New JPS Translation, pages 47–88, 376–77. Philadelphia: Jewish Publication Society, 1989.
Mark S. Smith. The Early History of God: Yahweh and the Other Deities in Ancient Israel, page 102. New York: HarperSanFrancisco, 1990..
Mario Brelich. Navigator of the Flood. Marlboro, Vermont: Marlboro Press, 1991.
Robert A. Di Vito. "The Demarcation of Divine and Human Realms in Genesis 2–11." In Creation in the Biblical Traditions. Edited by Richard J. Clifford and John J. Collins, pages 39–56. Washington, D.C.: Catholic Biblical Association of America, 1992.
Aaron Wildavsky. Assimilation versus Separation: Joseph the Administrator and the Politics of Religion in Biblical Israel, page 5. New Brunswick, New Jersey: Transaction Publishers, 1993.
I Studied Inscriptions from Before the Flood: Ancient Near Eastern, Literary, and Linguistic Approaches to Genesis 1–11. Edited by Richard S. Hess and David Toshio Tsumura. Winona Lake, Indiana: Eisenbrauns, 1994.
Judith S. Antonelli. "Naamah: Survivor of the Flood." In In the Image of God: A Feminist Commentary on the Torah, pages 19–26. Northvale, New Jersey: Jason Aronson, 1995.
Jacob Milgrom. "Bible Versus Babel: Why did God tell Abraham to leave Mesopotamia, the most advanced civilization of its time, for the backwater region of Canaan?" Bible Review, volume 11, number 2 (April 1995).
Frank H. Polak. "The Restful Waters of Noah." Journal of the Ancient Near Eastern Society, volume 23 (1995): pages 69–74.
Naomi H. Rosenblatt and Joshua Horwitz. Wrestling With Angels: What Genesis Teaches Us About Our Spiritual Identity, Sexuality, and Personal Relationships, pages 65–92. Delacorte Press, 1995.
Avivah Gottlieb Zornberg. The Beginning of Desire: Reflections on Genesis, pages 37–71. New York: Image Books/Doubelday, 1995.
Karen Armstrong. In the Beginning: A New Interpretation of Genesis, pages 39–53. New York: Knopf, 1996.
Norman Cohn. Noah's Flood: The Genesis Story in Western Thought. New Haven: Yale Univ. Press, 1996.
Ellen Frankel. The Five Books of Miriam: A Woman's Commentary on the Torah, pages 11–14. New York: G. P. Putnam's Sons, 1996.

Marc Gellman. God's Mailbox: More Stories About Stories in the Bible, pages 24–29, 107–11. New York: Morrow Junior Books, 1996.
James Morrow. "Bible Stories for Adults, No. 17: The Deluge" and "Bible Stories for Adults, No. 20: The Tower." In Bible Stories for Adults, pages 1–14, 61–84. New York: Harcourt Brace & Company, 1996.

W. Gunther Plaut. The Haftarah Commentary, pages 13–22. New York: UAHC Press, 1996.
Sorel Goldberg Loeb and Barbara Binder Kadden. Teaching Torah: A Treasury of Insights and Activities, pages 11–18. Denver: A.R.E. Publishing, 1997.

Jacob Migrom. "The Blood Taboo: Blood should not be ingested because it contains life. Whoever does so is guilty of murder." Bible Review, volume 13, number 4 (August 1997).
Susan Freeman. Teaching Jewish Virtues: Sacred Sources and Arts Activities, pages 4–6, 55–68, 269–82. Springfield, New Jersey: A.R.E. Publishing, 1999..
William Ryan and Walter Pitman. Noah's Flood: The New Scientific Discoveries About the Event that Changed History. New York: Simon & Schuster, 1999.
Adin Steinsaltz. Simple Words: Thinking About What Really Matters in Life, page 49. New York: Simon & Schuster, 1999.
Tamara Goshen-Gottstein. “The Souls that They Made: Physical Infertility and Spiritual Fecundity.” In Torah of the Mothers: Contemporary Jewish Women Read Classical Jewish Texts. Edited by Ora Wiskind Elper and Susan Handelman, pages 123–54. New York and Jerusalem: Urim Publications, 2000..
John S. Kselman. "Genesis." In The HarperCollins Bible Commentary. Edited by James L. Mays, pages 88–91. New York: HarperCollins Publishers, revised edition, 2000.
Julie Ringold Spitzer. "Mrs. Noah." In The Women's Torah Commentary: New Insights from Women Rabbis on the 54 Weekly Torah Portions. Edited by Elyse Goldstein, pages 53–56. Woodstock, Vermont: Jewish Lights Publishing, 2000.

Robert Bly. "Noah Watching the Rain." In The Night Abraham Called to the Stars: Poems, page 89. New York: HarperCollins/Perennial, 2001.
Lainie Blum Cogan and Judy Weiss. Teaching Haftarah: Background, Insights, and Strategies, pages 314–23. Denver: A.R.E. Publishing, 2002.
Michael Fishbane. The JPS Bible Commentary: Haftarot, pages 11–17. Philadelphia: Jewish Publication Society, 2002.
Tikva Frymer-Kensky. "To the Barricades: Views against the Other." In Reading the Women of the Bible, pages 199–208. New York: Schocken Books, 2002. (the curse and genealogy of Canaan).
Ian Wilson. Before the Flood: The Biblical Flood as a Real Event and How It Changed the Course of Civilization. New York: St. Martin's Griffin, 2002.
David M. Goldenberg. The Curse of Ham: Race and Slavery in Early Judaism, Christianity, and Islam. Princeton University Press, 2003.
Rodger Kamenetz. "Noah's Grapes." In The Lowercase Jew, page 38. Evanston, Illinois: Triquarterly Books/Northwestern University Press, 2003.

Leon R. Kass. The Beginning of Wisdom: Reading Genesis, pages 151–243. New York: Free Press, 2003.
Joseph Telushkin. The Ten Commandments of Character: Essential Advice for Living an Honorable, Ethical, Honest Life, pages 87–91, 275–78. New York: Bell Tower, 2003.
Robert Alter. The Five Books of Moses: A Translation with Commentary, pages 40–61. New York: W.W. Norton & Co., 2004.
Jon D. Levenson. "Genesis." In The Jewish Study Bible. Edited by Adele Berlin and Marc Zvi Brettler, pages 21–30. New York: Oxford University Press, 2004.
David Maine. The Preservationist. New York: St. Martin's Press, 2004.
Kacy Barnett-Gramckow. The Heavens Before. Chicago: Moody, 2004.
Kacy Barnett-Gramckow. He Who Lifts the Skies. Chicago: Moody, 2004.
Kacy Barnett-Gramckow. A Crown in the Stars. Chicago: Moody, 2005.
John S. Bergsma and Scott W. Hahn. "Noah's Nakedness and Curse on Canaan (Genesis 9:20–27)." Journal of Biblical Literature, volume 124, number 1 (2005): pages 25–40.
Professors on the Parashah: Studies on the Weekly Torah Reading Edited by Leib Moscovitz, pages 25–30. Jerusalem: Urim Publications, 2005.
Muhammad A.S. Abdel Haleem. "The Qur'anic Employment of the Story of Noah." Journal of Qur'anic Studies, volume 8, number 1 (2006): pages 38–57.
W. Gunther Plaut. The Torah: A Modern Commentary: Revised Edition. Revised edition edited by David E.S. Stern, pages 57–87. New York: Union for Reform Judaism, 2006.

Khalid Sindawi. "Noah and Noah's Ark as the Primordial Model of Shīʿism in Shīʿite Literature." Quaderni di Studi Arabi (new series), volume 1 (2006): pages 29–48.
Michael E. Stone. "The Book(s) Attributed to Noah." Dead Sea Discoveries, volume 13, number 1 (2006): pages 4–23.
Suzanne A. Brody. "Coloring." In Dancing in the White Spaces: The Yearly Torah Cycle and More Poems, page 63. Shelbyville, Kentucky: Wasteland Press, 2007.

Esther Jungreis. Life Is a Test, pages 168, 218–19, 229–30. Brooklyn: Shaar Press, 2007.
James L. Kugel. How To Read the Bible: A Guide to Scripture, Then and Now, pages 69–88, 90, 92, 97, 108, 649, 658. New York: Free Press, 2007.
Steven D. Mason. “Another Flood? Genesis 9 and Isaiah's Broken Eternal Covenant.” Journal for the Study of the Old Testament, volume 32, number 2 (December 2007): pages 177–98
Andrei Orlov. "The Heir of Righteousness and the King of Righteousness: The Priestly Noachic Polemics in 2 Enoch and the Epistle to the Hebrews." The Journal of Theological Studies (new series), volume 58, number 1 (April 2007): pages 45–65.

Basya Schechter. “Yona.” In Pharaoh's Daughter. Haran. 2007.
Steven Greenberg. "From Delight to Destruction: The Double-Faced Power of Sex: Parashat Noach (Genesis 6:9–11:32)." In Torah Queeries: Weekly Commentaries on the Hebrew Bible. Edited by Gregg Drinkwater, Joshua Lesser, and David Shneer; foreword by Judith Plaskow, pages 19–23. New York: New York University Press, 2009.
Laura Lieber. "Portraits of Righteousness: Noah in Early Christian and Jewish Hymnography." Zeitschrift für Religions und Geistesgeschichte, volume 61, number 4 (2009) : pages 332–55.
The Torah: A Women's Commentary. Edited by Tamara Cohn Eskenazi and Andrea L. Weiss, pages 35–58. New York: URJ Press, 2008.
Jonathan Goldstein. "Noah and the Ark" and "The Tower of Babel." In Ladies and Gentlemen, the Bible!, pages 44–78. New York: Riverhead Books, 2009.
Reuven Hammer. Entering Torah: Prefaces to the Weekly Torah Portion, pages 11–15. New York: Gefen Publishing House, 2009.

Jonathan Sacks. Covenant & Conversation: A Weekly Reading of the Jewish Bible: Genesis: The Book of Beginnings, pages 41–64. New Milford, Connecticut: Maggid Books, 2009.
T.K. Thorne. Noah's Wife. Fountain Hills, Arizona: Chalet Publishers, 2009.
John H. Walton. "Genesis." In Zondervan Illustrated Bible Backgrounds Commentary. Edited by John H. Walton, volume 1, pages 46–68. Grand Rapids, Michigan: Zondervan, 2009.
Mark A. Awabdy. “Babel, Suspense, and the Introduction to the Terah-Abram Narrative.” Journal for the Study of the Old Testament, volume 35, number 1 (September 2010): pages 3–29.
Mary Katherine Y.H. Hom. “‘…A Mighty Hunter before YHWH’: Genesis 10:9 and the Moral-Theological Evaluation of Nimrod.” Vetus Testamentum, volume 60, number 1 (2010): pages 63–68.

Noah and His Book(s). Edited by Michael E. Stone, Aryeh Amihay, and Vered Hillel. Atlanta: Society of Biblical Literature, 2010.
David VanDrunen. "Natural Law in Noahic Accent: A Covenantal Conception of Natural Law Drawn from Genesis 9." Journal of the Society of Christian Ethics, volume 30, number 2 (Fall/Winter 2010): pages 131–49.
Brad Embry. “The ‘Naked Narrative’ from Noah to Leviticus: Reassessing Voyeurism in the Account of Noah’s Nakedness in Genesis 9.22–24.” Journal for the Study of the Old Testament, volume 35, number 4 (June 2011): pages 417–33.
Jeannie St. John Taylor. City of a Thousand Gods: The Story of Noah's Daughter-in-Law. Living Clay, 2011.
Calum Carmichael. The Book of Numbers: A Critique of Genesis, pages 11, 19, 69, 108, 114, 118. New Haven: Yale University Press, 2012.

Joydeb Chitrakar and Gita Wolf. The Enduring Ark. Chennai, India: Tara Books, 2012. (Indian version of the story of Noah's Ark, illustrated by Bengali Patua scroll painter).
William G. Dever. The Lives of Ordinary People in Ancient Israel: When Archaeology and the Bible Intersect, page 46. Grand Rapids, Michigan: William B. Eerdmans Publishing Company, 2012.
Shmuel Herzfeld. "Failure: It's No Big Deal." In Fifty-Four Pick Up: Fifteen-Minute Inspirational Torah Lessons, pages 7–11. Jerusalem: Gefen Publishing House, 2012.
Irving Finkel. The Ark Before Noah: Decoding the Story of the Flood. London: Hodder & Stoughton, 2014.
Ralph Amelan. "Guarantor of the natural world." The Jerusalem Report, volume 25, number 15 (November 3, 2014): page 47.
Ralph Amelan. "Defining the Jews: Irving Finkel proposes a theory that accounts for the birth of the Hebrew Bible and how the story of Noah and the Flood came to be in it." The Jerusalem Report, volume 25, number 18 (December 15, 2014): pages 42–45.
Richard Faussette. "The Biblical Significance of the Tower of Babel." (2015).
Carol M. Kaminski. Was Noah Good?: Finding Favour in the Flood Narrative. New York: Bloomsbury T&T Clark, 2015.*Jonathan Sacks. Lessons in Leadership: A Weekly Reading of the Jewish Bible, pages 7–12. New Milford, Connecticut: Maggid Books, 2015.
Joseph Blenkinsopp. “The First Family: Terah and Sons.” Journal for the Study of the Old Testament, volume 41, number 1 (September 2016): pages 3–13.
Hubert Damisch. "Noah's Ark." AA Files, number 72 (2016): pages 115–26.
Jean-Pierre Isbouts. Archaeology of the Bible: The Greatest Discoveries From Genesis to the Roman Era, pages 26–33. Washington, D.C.: National Geographic, 2016.
Jonathan Sacks. Essays on Ethics: A Weekly Reading of the Jewish Bible, pages 9–14. New Milford, Connecticut: Maggid Books, 2016.
Shai Held. The Heart of Torah, Volume 1: Essays on the Weekly Torah Portion: Genesis and Exodus, pages 12–20. Philadelphia: Jewish Publication Society, 2017.
Steven Levy and Sarah Levy. The JPS Rashi Discussion Torah Commentary, pages 6–8. Philadelphia: Jewish Publication Society, 2017.
Jeffrey K. Salkin. The JPS B'nai Mitzvah Torah Commentary, pages 7–11. Philadelphia: Jewish Publication Society, 2017.
Tremper Longman III, John H. Walton, and Stephen O. Moshier. The Lost World of the Flood: Mythology, Theology, and the Deluge Debate.  Downers Grove, Illinois: IVP Academic, 2018.

External links

Texts 
Masoretic text and 1917 JPS translation
Hear the parashah chanted 
Hear the parashah read in Hebrew
Video Lectures on Parashat Noach

Commentaries 

Academy for Jewish Religion, California
Academy for Jewish Religion, New York
Aish.com 
Akhlah: The Jewish Children's Learning Network
Aleph Beta Academy
American Jewish University – Ziegler School of Rabbinic Studies
Anshe Emes Synagogue, Los Angeles 
Ari Goldwag
Ascent of Safed
Bar-Ilan University 
Bible Odyssey
Chabad.org
eparsha.com
G-dcast
The Israel Koschitzky Virtual Beit Midrash
Jewish Agency for Israel
Jewish Theological Seminary
Kabbala Online
Mechon Hadar
Miriam Aflalo
MyJewishLearning.com
Ohr Sameach
Orthodox Union
OzTorah, Torah from Australia
Oz Ve Shalom — Netivot Shalom
Pardes from Jerusalem
Parshah Parts
Professor James L. Kugel
Rabbi Dov Linzer
Rabbi Fabian Werbin
Rabbi Jonathan Sacks
RabbiShimon.com 
Rabbi Shlomo Riskin
Rabbi Shmuel Herzfeld
Rabbi Stan Levin 
Reconstructionist Judaism 
Sephardic Institute
Shiur.com
613.org Jewish Torah Audio
Tanach Study Center
Teach613.org, Torah Education at Cherry Hill
TheTorah.com
Torah from Dixie 
Torah.org
TorahVort.com
Union for Reform Judaism
United Synagogue of Conservative Judaism
What's Bothering Rashi?
Yeshivat Chovevei Torah
Yeshiva University

 
Weekly Torah readings from Genesis
Noah
Weekly Torah readings in Cheshvan